Nolinophanes is a genus of moths in the subfamily Arctiinae. It contains the single species Nolinophanes sicciaecolor, which is found on the Tenimbar Islands.

References

Natural History Museum Lepidoptera generic names catalog

Lithosiini